Maximum Bob is an American comedy-drama television series that aired on ABC from August 4 until September 15, 1998. Starring Beau Bridges, the show was based on Elmore Leonard's 1991 novel of the same name.

Premise
The series centered on Bob Gibbs (played by Bridges), an ultra right-wing judge known for giving the maximum sentence to defendants. Other characters included the judge's psychic wife Leanne (Kiersten Warren) who channels the spirit of a young slave girl named Wanda Grace (Rae'Ven Larrymore Kelly); a widower sheriff with a knack for ballroom dancing; and Kathy Baker, a comely spitfire public defender (Liz Vassey) from Miami. The storylines served mainly to introduce the cast of eccentric characters, and were set in the fictional backwoods Florida town of Deepwater.

Judge Gibbs' young wife performed in a mermaid show until she nearly lost her life to an alligator, after which she abruptly retired from the business and can no longer even go in her swimming pool. Baker comes to Deepwater on a case and becomes a romantic target for the local sheriff, as well as a potential conquest for the always lustful judge. The show also includes a family of inbred, myopic, dysfunctional people with a criminal bent.

Cast

 Beau Bridges as Judge Bob Gibbs
 Liz Vassey as Kathy Baker
 Sam Robards as Sheriff Gary Hammond
 Kiersten Warren as Leanne Lancaster
 Rae'Ven Larrymore Kelly as Wanda Grace

Episodes

References

External links

1990s American comedy-drama television series
1990s American legal television series
1998 American television series debuts
1998 American television series endings
American Broadcasting Company original programming
Television shows based on American novels
Television shows set in Florida
Television series by Warner Bros. Television Studios